Bloody Wednesday can refer to:
 Bloody Wednesday (film), a 1988 film based on the San Ysidro McDonald's massacre
 Bloody Wednesday, the events of 15 August 1906 in the (Congress) Kingdom of Poland
Operation Harvest Festival, murder of 43,000 Jews beginning on 3 November 1943
 The Colorado Avalanche–Detroit Red Wings brawl, a NHL fight between the Avalanche and the Red Wings

See also
 Black Wednesday (disambiguation)
Wednesday